Rooster River is a river in Fairfield County, Connecticut that lies on and serves as the border between Bridgeport and Fairfield. It has flooded on numerous occasions and so has its own flood control project.

The river is 15.3 square miles in length. Its headwater is heavily urbanized watershed; in addition to Bridgeport and Fairfield, it also runs through Trumbull. Rooster River extends southward into Black Rock Harbor and Long Island Sound by way of the Ash Creek Estuary. The source of the river is Lake Forest in Bridgeport, Horse Tavern Brook in Trumbull, and London's Brook from the Fairchild Wheeler golf course.

See also
List of rivers of Connecticut

References

Rivers of Fairfield County, Connecticut
Geography of Bridgeport, Connecticut
Fairfield, Connecticut
Rivers of Connecticut